Friendly Fire is an album by the American jazz saxophonists Joe Lovano and Greg Osby recorded in 1998 and released on the Blue Note label.

Reception

In his review for AllMusic, Stephen Thomas Erlewine states, "Lovano and Osby are both first-class improvisers, and they turn in dynamic performances throughout the album, whether it's on originals or standards. They turn Friendly Fire into a compelling listen that's the musical equivalent of the title's promise". Bill Shoemaker of JazzTimes commented "Track after track, Lovano and Osby confirm their marquee status. Consistently, their flinty exchanges provoke them to go beyond their usual high standards of passionate intelligence. As a result, this pairing has long-term potential. Hopefully, Lovano and Osby won’t wait for the next Blue Note anniversary for a second session".

Track listing
All compositions by Joe Lovano except as indicated
 "Geo J Lo" (Greg Osby) - 6:15 
 "The Wild East" - 6:34 
 "Serene" (Eric Dolphy) - 7:25 
 "Broad Way Blues" (Ornette Coleman) - 8:08 
 "Monk's Mood" (Thelonious Monk) - 4:47 
 "Idris" - 11:30 
 "Truth Be Told" (Osby) - 5:35 
 "Silenos" (Osby) - 5:36 
 "Alexander the Great" - 11:52

Personnel
Joe Lovano – tenor saxophone, soprano saxophone, flute
Greg Osby - alto saxophone, soprano saxophone
Jason Moran - piano
Cameron Brown – bass
Idris Muhammad – drums

References

Blue Note Records albums
Joe Lovano albums
Greg Osby albums
1998 albums
Collaborative albums